The 2018–19 Nemzeti Bajnokság I (known as the K&H férfi kézilabda liga for sponsorship reasons) is the 68th season of the Nemzeti Bajnokság I, Hungarian premier Handball league.

Team information 
As in the previous season, 14 teams played in the 2018–19 season.
After the 2017–18 season, Váci KSE and Orosházi FKSE were relegated to the 2018–19 Nemzeti Bajnokság I/B. They were replaced by two clubs from the 2017–18 Nemzeti Bajnokság I/B; Mezőkövesdi KC and Vecsés SE.

Personnel and kits
Following is the list of clubs competing in 2018–19 Nemzeti Bajnokság I, with their president, head coach, kit manufacturer and shirt sponsor.

Managerial changes

League table

Schedule and results
In the table below the home teams are listed on the left and the away teams along the top.

Finals

Game 1

Game 2

Telekom Veszprém won the Finals, 62–51 on aggregate.

Season statistics

Top goalscorers

Attendances
Updated to games played on 19 May 2019.
Source: League matches: NB I 2018/2019
Attendance numbers without Final matches.

Number of teams by counties

See also
 2018–19 Magyar Kupa
 2018–19 Nemzeti Bajnokság I/B
 2018–19 Nemzeti Bajnokság II

References

External links
 Hungarian Handball Federaration 
 hetmeteres.hu

Nemzeti Bajnokság I (men's handball)
2018–19 domestic handball leagues
Nemzeti Bajnoksag I Men